Wightlink is a ferry company operating routes across The Solent between Hampshire and the Isle of Wight in the south of England. It operates car ferries between Lymington and Yarmouth, and Portsmouth and Fishbourne and a fast passenger-only catamaran between Portsmouth Harbour and Ryde Pier. The company is jointly owned by Basalt Infrastructure Partners based in the United Kingdom and Fiera Infrastructure based in Canada.

History
Wightlink and its forerunners have provided ferry services to and from the Isle of Wight for more than 160 years. In the early 19th century, ferries ran to the island from Lymington and Portsmouth. Later, steam ferries operated a circular route around Lymington, Yarmouth, Cowes, Ryde and Portsmouth. When the railway companies became involved they concentrated on two direct routes, Lymington to Yarmouth and Portsmouth to Ryde. Ownership of the ferries eventually passed from the British Railways Board to Sealink.

In 1984 Sealink was sold to Sea Containers. When Stena Line bought Sealink in 1990, the Isle of Wight ferries remained with Sea Containers, as Wightlink. In June 1995 Wightlink was the subject of a management buyout. In 2005 it was bought by the Macquarie European Infrastructure Fund.

In 2005, a Wightlink car ferry featured briefly in the film Fragile starring Calista Flockhart. The ferry is shown very briefly in a wide-angle shot. Closer shots used Red Funnel's .

In October 2006 Wightlink announced its intention to build two new ferries for the Yarmouth to Lymington route. These ships are slightly bigger than their predecessors, with extra vehicle space, but only accommodate 360 passengers compared to 500 on the older vessels. Wightlink later announced that a third new ferry would enter service in spring 2009. A dispute with some Lymington residents led to delay and threatened the viability of the route. In November 2008, the service was reduced so only two ships were required, allowing for the delay in the introduction of the new vessels. Sea trials were not complete by November 2008 and introduction became pressing with the expiry of safety certificates on the previous fleet. Wightlink proposed interim arrangements enabling them restricted use of the new ferries until the trials could be completed in full.

In March 2008 Wightlink revealed that an order had been placed with FBMA Marine to construct two new passenger catamarans for the Portsmouth to Ryde service, to replace the three craft currently employed. They entered service in 2009.

From May 2008 Wightlink introduced a fuel surcharge on all crossings, linked to the price of Brent Crude oil. However, in November 2008 the surcharge dropped to zero following the sharp reduction in crude prices during the credit crunch and as of November 2009 was still at zero.

Wightlink planned to spend £17.5 million on improving its Portsmouth to Fishbourne route. This involved remodelling the terminal facilities at both Fishbourne and Portsmouth. The flagship  was to have its upper car deck adjusted so vehicles access it directly from on-shore ramps. Two of the older ferries were to be stretched in length by 12 metres, with upper car decks similar to St Clare'''s being added, replacing movable mezzanine decks. As part of this investment project the reservations and ticketing system was replaced by CarRes from Carus.

On 16 February 2015, Wightlink was sold by the Macquarie European Infrastructure Fund to Balfour Beatty Infrastructure Partners (BBIP). On 15 May 2015, Wightlink announced a revised investment of £45 million to include the purchase a new ferry, upgrading St Clare'' and modifications to the terminals at both ends to facilitate double-deck loading.

In July 2016, Balfour Beatty exited BBIP, which became Basalt Infrastructure Partners.

In August 2017, Wightlink announced that a new vehicle ferry, would be built for the Portsmouth to Fishbourne service. It entered service on 26 August 2018. In May 2019, BBIP sold a 50% stake in the business to Fiera Infrastructure of Canada.

Current fleet

Vehicle ferries

The introduction of the Wight class ferries was a much-discussed affair, with some Lymington residents claiming that the increased size of the ferries posed a risk, both in environmental terms and to users of pleasure craft on the Lymington river.

High-speed craft

Historic fleet
The following ferries have operated historically on routes run by Wightlink or previous companies that have been absorbed by Wightlink.

Lymington-Yarmouth

Portsmouth-Ryde

Portsmouth-Fishbourne

Langstone Harbour-Bembridge

References

Bibliography

External links 

 
 

Ferry companies of England
Ferry transport on the Isle of Wight
Transport in Hampshire
Transport in Portsmouth